Dicheirus dilatatus is a species of ground beetle in the family Carabidae. It is found in North America.

Subspecies
These two subspecies belong to the species Dicheirus dilatatus:
 Dicheirus dilatatus angulatus Casey, 1914
 Dicheirus dilatatus dilatatus (Dejean, 1829)

References

Further reading

 

Harpalinae
Articles created by Qbugbot
Beetles described in 1829